Kiana Johnson (born August 23, 1993) is an American professional basketball player for Valur of the Úrvalsdeild kvenna. She played college basketball for Michigan State and Virginia Union, where she was named the NCAA DII Player of the Year in 2016. In 2021, she won the Icelandic championship as a member of Valur.

College career
Johnson started her college career with Michigan State in 2011. She transferred to Virginia Union in 2014 and sat out the 2014–2015 season due to NCAA Transfer Rules. During the 2015–2016 season, Johnson averaged 29.3 points and 8.7 assists, and was named the NCAA Division II women's basketball tournament Player of the Year.

Playing career
In 2016, Johnson signed with Forssan Alku of the Finnish Naisten Korisliiga. For the season she averaged 18.9 points and 5.8 assists per game.

She remained in Finland the following season, signing with Tapiolan Honka. In 33 games, Johnson averaged 17.1 points and 5.5 assists per game.

In 2018, Johnson signed with KR of the Icelandic Úrvalsdeild kvenna. On February 6, 2019, Kiana scored 50 points in a 102–81 victory against Breiðablik along with 16 rebounds and 10 assists. For the season, she averaged 23.2 points, 10.4 rebounds, 7.3 assists and 3.4 steals.

In July 2019, Johnson signed with reigning Úrvalsdeild champions Valur. Valur opened the 2019–20 season by defeating Keflavík, 105–81, in the annual Icelandic Super Cup where Johnson posted 14 points, 6 rebounds, 5 assists and game-high 6 steals. In the Úrvalsdeild, she averaged 22.8 points, 8.0 rebounds and a league leading 8.2 assists per game. However, the last three games of the season and the whole playoffs were canceled due to the coronavirus pandemic in Iceland with Valur being named Divisional champions (Icelandic: Deildarmeistarar) for having the best record at the time but no national champions were crowned.

On 2 June 2021, she won the national championship after Valur beat Haukar 3–0 in the Úrvalsdeild finals.

After playing for Societa Sportiva Bocca in Venezuela, Johnson returned to Iceland and signed again with Valur in June 2022.

Statistics

College statistics

Source

References

External links
Icelandic statistics at kki.is
Naisten Korisliiga statistics at korisliiga.fi
Virginia Union profile at vuusports.com
Michigan State profile at msuspartans.com

1993 births
Living people
21st-century American women
American expatriate basketball people in Finland
American expatriate basketball people in Iceland
American expatriate basketball people in Venezuela
American women's basketball players
KR women's basketball players
Point guards
Úrvalsdeild kvenna basketball players
Valur women's basketball players